Trifolium alpinum is a species of flowering plant in the legume family known by the common name alpine clover. It is native to the Alps.

This plant is a perennial herb with a large taproot which can be 1 metre long and 1 centimetre wide. The short stems bear ternate leaves divided into three leaflets each up to 5 cm long. The fragrant flowers are pink to light red, tinged with purple.

This plant grows at elevations between 1700 and 2500 m, sometimes up to 2800 m, in subalpine and alpine climates. It commonly grows on acidic soils.

In alpine regions this plant provides an important forage for livestock. It is also good for stabilizing sites of erosion at high elevations.

References

alpinum
Flora of the Pyrenees
Flora of the Alps
Plants described in 1753
Taxa named by Carl Linnaeus